Titanoecidae is a family of araneomorph spiders first described by Pekka T. Lehtinen in 1967. It is fairly widespread in the New World and Eurasia with five genera and more than 50 species worldwide. These are mostly dark-colored builders of "woolly" (cribellate) silk webs. Several species are found at relatively high altitudes in mountain ranges and may be very common in such habitats.

Genera

, the World Spider Catalog accepts the following genera:

Anuvinda Lehtinen, 1967 – Asia
Goeldia Keyserling, 1891 – South America, Mexico
Nurscia Simon, 1874 – Asia, Europe
Pandava Lehtinen, 1967 – Asia, Africa, Papua New Guinea
Titanoeca Thorell, 1870 – Asia, North America, Europe, Ecuador, Algeria

See also
 List of Titanoecidae species
 Titanoecoidea

References

External links

Arachnology Home Pages: Araneae
 

 
Araneomorphae families
Taxa named by Pekka T. Lehtinen